Last Battle: Twilight 2000 is a 1989 board game published by Game Designers' Workshop.

Contents
Last Battle: Twilight 2000 is a game in which post-nuclear holocaust warfare is simulated, with a combat resolution system in the Twilight: 2000 role-playing game.

Reception
Norman Smith reviewed Last Battle for Games International magazine, and gave it 3 stars out of 5, and stated that "This must be a welcome addition for Twilight 2000 enthusiast and for those who are interested in man to man, tank to tank encounters of the modem era. Those who want a follow on from Team Yankee or Test of Arms may find Last Battle an acquired taste."

Reviews
Dragon #152

References

Board games introduced in 1989
Game Designers' Workshop games
Twilight: 2000